Zdravko Todorov (born 28 November 1982) is a Bulgarian footballer who plays as a striker. He was raised in Beroe Stara Zagora's youth teams.
Born in Harmanli, he started his career in a local team, Hebros. At 16 years old Todorov went to play for PFC Beroe Stara Zagora. Between 2002 and 2004 he played for AKB Minyor from the town of Radnevo. In June 2004 he returned to Beroe.

Height - 1.75 m.
Weight - 72 kg.

References

Bulgarian footballers
1982 births
Living people
First Professional Football League (Bulgaria) players
PFC Beroe Stara Zagora players
Association football forwards
People from Harmanli
Sportspeople from Haskovo Province